Anna Koblencová (born 25 February 1997)  is a Czech slalom canoeist who competed at the international level from 2012 to 2015.

She won a silver medal in the C1 team event at the 2013 ICF Canoe Slalom World Championships in Prague.

References

External links 
 Anna KOBLENCOVA at CanoeSlalom.net

Czech female canoeists
Living people
1997 births
Medalists at the ICF Canoe Slalom World Championships